Mota Gunda village is situated near Bhanvad in Devbhumi Dwarka district, Gujarat, India.
The population of the village is about 2000. Most of the villagers are engaged in farming and taking ground nuts, bajra, cotton, sesame, beans, etc. The village has an education facility like primary school up to 8th standard and secondary and higher secondary school up to 12 standard, namely Shree Gunda Kelavani Mandal High School. There are many social trusts are engaged for various activities Shri Krishna Gau Shala, Navratri Mandal, temple trust, Patel Seva Samaj. Also two Jain temples are there 1 Pujay Punja bhsbha (Mehta family) and there is Maa Randal (Varia family) all Gundawala Jain are visit to native place for darshan and reminiscing. And also arranging many function for villagers like medical camp, blood-donation camp by Shri Mota Gunda Jain Social Group headed by Bimalbhai Mehta.

The nearest railway station is Bhanvad, 12 km away, and the nearest airport is Jamnagar, 80 km away.

References

Villages in Devbhoomi Dwarka district